Marieholm is a village situated in Gnosjö Municipality, Jönköping County, Sweden with 218 inhabitants in 2005.

References 

Populated places in Jönköping County